Lai Chi Wai (born December 25, 1982) is a rock climber, sport climber, and motivational speaker from Hong Kong. He is a four-time champion of the Asian Rock Climbing Championships and the world's first Chinese winner of the X-Game's extreme sports. In 2011, he got into a serious traffic accident that left him paraplegic. On December 9, 2016, upon the 5th anniversary of the car accident, Lai climbed up Lion Rock in a wheelchair, and became the first Chinese athlete to be nominated for the Laureus World's Best Sporting Moment of the month, which he lost to a viral video which showed a packed sports stadium of 70,000 people in Iowa turning and waving to children in an adjacent hospital. Netizens, touched by Lai's achievement, said he embodied the "spirit of Lion Rock", which has come to symbolize Hong Kong's can-do spirit in the midst of adversities. On January 16, 2021, Lai attempted to climb the 320-metre Nina Tower at Urban Climb 300M+,. It was a fund-raising activity organized by Ignite Community Services, a non-profit-making organization which Lai co-founded with Stella Chiu, for spinal cord injured patients. However, after he had climbed 65 storeys or 250 metres, he was forced to call off due to strong winds. The charity challenge successfully raised about USD 1 million. The attempt was originally scheduled on January 9 but postponed because of bad weather.

He is married and has a son.

References

External links 

1982 births
Living people
Chinese rock climbers
Hong Kong people